The Villalobos River is a river of Guatemala. It is a tributary that drains into Caquetá river thirty miles above Puerto Limón, Costa Rica.

See also
List of rivers of Guatemala

References

Rand McNally, The New International Atlas, 1993.

Rivers of Guatemala